Closed face or Closed-face may refer to;

 A manner of holding the paddle in the sport of pickleball
 A type of club in the sport of golf
 A standard sandwich enclosed in two slices of bread, when distinguished from an open-faced sandwich atop one slice of bread
 A spincast fishing reel